Attersee may refer to:

Attersee (lake), a lake in Austria
Attersee (town), a town near that lake

People with the surname
Christian Attersee (born 1940), Austrian painter